Ana Patricia Ayala Sánchez (born 25 August 1966 in Artigas Department) is a Uruguayan speech therapist and politician.

Biography
In 2010, she was elected as the first female Intendant of Artigas Department.

In 2017, she was temporarily the Vice President of Uruguay.

As of June 2018, she is temporarily the President of Uruguay.

References

1966 births
Living people
People from Artigas Department
Broad Front (Uruguay) politicians
Movement of Popular Participation politicians
Members of the Chamber of Representatives of Uruguay (2010–2015)
Members of the Senate of Uruguay (2015–2020)
Intendants of Artigas Department
21st-century Uruguayan women politicians
21st-century Uruguayan politicians
Uruguayan women in politics
Speech and language pathologists
University of the Republic (Uruguay) alumni